The Cabinet of Peru (also called the Presidential Cabinet of Peru or the Council of Ministers) is composed of all the Ministers of State. The cabinet is presided by the President of the Council of Ministers, a position likened to that of a prime minister. The Prime Minister presides over the meetings of the Council of Ministers, unless the President of the Republic is present.

Functions
The Cabinet has, under the Constitution, the following main duties:
 Approve laws that the President submits to Congress
 Approve legislative decrees and also urgent decrees that President of the Republic dictates, as well as laws, decrees, and resolutions arranged by law
 To deliberate on subjects of public interest.

For the Cabinet to reach any agreement, the approving vote of the majority of its members is required.

Ministers
Ministers of State are in charge of managing politics and the activities of various sectors that direct and manage public services. The requirements to be a Minister of State are to be Peruvian by birth, a citizen, and be at least 25 years of age.

The Ministers of State are appointed discretionally by the President of the Republic, in coordination with the Prime Minister. While individual cabinet members do not require to be confirmed by Congress, when a new Prime Minister is appointed, the entire cabinet is subjected to a Congressional "vote of confidence". Likewise, if the Prime Minister resigns from office, all members of the cabinet are constitutionally forced to resign.

In special situations, a Minister of State in charge of one sector can temporarily assume the role and responsibilities held by another Minister in case of illness, travel, or other absence of the latter. All actions by the President must be approved by the Minister of State in charge of the correspondent sector to be valid under Peruvian law.

Current Cabinet

External links
  Official website

1821 establishments in Peru
Government ministries of Peru